Ashley Antoni Akpan (born 6 February 2004) is a Polish professional footballer who plays as a right-back for Aldershot Town.

Club career
Born in Warsaw, Poland to a Nigerian father and Polish mother, Akpan started his footballing career with Kosa Konstancin at the age of five, spending four years before his family moved to London, England when he was still a child. He joined the academy of Chelsea, where he would go on to play for seven years before his release in 2020.

Prior to his release, he had trialled with Leeds United, and was linked with Fulham in February 2020. He went on to trial with Sunderland in December of the same year. He also played briefly for Walton & Hersham, featuring in one game for the under-18 side in April 2021.

Eventually he returned to Poland, and in August 2021 he signed for Wisła Kraków. He left the club after less than a year, in summer 2022, and returned to England in winter of the same year, signing for Aldershot Town.

International career
Eligible to represent Poland, Nigeria and England, Akpan has represented Poland at under-15 level.

Personal life
His sister, Ashanti, is also a footballer, and plays for Chelsea.

References

External links
 

2004 births
Living people
Footballers from Warsaw
Polish people of Nigerian descent
Polish footballers
Poland youth international footballers
Nigerian footballers
Association football defenders
Chelsea F.C. players
Wisła Kraków players
Aldershot Town F.C. players
Polish expatriate footballers
Polish expatriate sportspeople in England
Expatriate footballers in England